Lecithocera phratriastis is a moth in the family Lecithoceridae. It was described by Edward Meyrick in 1929. It is found in Sri Lanka.

The wingspan is about 13 mm. The forewings are pale ochreous, with some faint light brownish speckling. The stigmata are blackish, the first discal small, the second larger and transverse, the plical reduced to two or three specks beneath the first discal, a small cloudy dark fuscous subdorsal spot is found beneath the second discal and there are some minute dark fuscous terminal specks. The hindwings are whitish ochreous.

References

Moths described in 1929
phratriastis